Nicklas Shipnoski (born 1 January 1998) is a German professional footballer who plays as a forward for Jahn Regensburg on loan from Fortuna Düsseldorf.

International career
Shipnoski has represented Germany at U18, U19, and U20 levels.

Career statistics

References

External links
 

Living people
1998 births
People from Worms, Germany
German footballers
Footballers from Rhineland-Palatinate
Association football forwards
Germany youth international footballers
1. FC Kaiserslautern players
SV Wehen Wiesbaden players
1. FC Saarbrücken players
Fortuna Düsseldorf players
SSV Jahn Regensburg players
2. Bundesliga players
3. Liga players